Wayne Township is a township in Doniphan County, Kansas, USA.  As of the 2000 census, its population was 226.

Geography
According to the USGS, it contains one cemetery, Doniphan.

The stream of Rock Creek runs through this township.  It is also drained by Independence and Brush Creeks.

History
Wayne Township was organized on September 1, 1855. It was named for General Anthony Wayne.

References

 USGS Geographic Names Information System (GNIS)
 Gray's History of Doniphan County

External links
 US-Counties.com
 City-Data.com

Townships in Doniphan County, Kansas
Townships in Kansas
1855 establishments in Kansas Territory